The Australian Motor Sport Hall of Fame was established by the Confederation of Australian Motor Sport "to give recognition to those who have brought greatness to motor sport in all its many disciplines, over the entire history of the sport in Australia." The Hall of Fame is strongly supported by Motorcycling Australia (MA), Karting Australia, the Australian National Drag Racing Association (ANDRA), Speedway Australia, the Australian Grand Prix Corporation and V8 Supercars. 
The Hall of Fame will cover motor racing, motorcycling, rallying, off road, drag racing, karting and speedway.

The Hall of Fame Committee  comprises respected members of all disciplines within the sport plus experienced journalists with a strong knowledge of motor sport's history and its participants. In March 2016, there were 30 inaugural inductees into the Fame. In 2017 another 20 inductees were added to the HoF.  Twenty-one new members were inducted in 2018.  Thirteen have been named for 2019, including a few high-profile sprint car and Supercars champions.

Inductees

References

Motorsport in Australia
Halls of fame in Australia
Auto racing museums and halls of fame